The Pehdzeh Ki First Nation is a member of the Dehcho First Nations in the Northwest Territories of Canada.

The Pehdzeh Ki First Nation is located in Wrigley. The community is located along the Mackenzie River and the Mackenzie Highway ends at Wrigley. Pehdzeh Ki First Nation has over 300 band members but only a few live in the community.

Wrigley is home to a community nursing station, a confectionery store, Chief Julien Yendo School (Grades K-8), a gas station, and a few businesses, including:
Ma-Dza-She-Deh Venture; contracting services, bobcat, truck, trailer, etc.
M&M Tours; Jet boat tours & Charters
Mackenzie Mountain Tours; Tourism & Hospitality
Raymonds River Taxi; Boat charters
Charlottes Corner Store
Beaver Adventures
Pehdzeh Ki Contractors

The youth in Wrigley are avid drummers and handgame players. They practice at least twice a week amongst themselves. They are the future for Wrigley.

Past Leadership
In September 2004, David Moses was elected to a two-year term as Chief of the First Nation. Darcy E. Moses was elected Chief in 2006. Tim Lennie was elected Chief in 2009, re-elected in 2011, and resigned in 2012. Sharon Pellissey was elected to replace Lennie in July 2012. Pellissey was removed from office later that year, and Lennie returned to the position.

References

External links
 Government of Canada's Department of Indian and Northern Affairs First Nation profile

First Nations in the Northwest Territories